Pinguicula casabitoana, commonly known as the Casabito butterwort, is a Critically Endangered species of butterwort endemic to the Dominican Republic. This species is mostly epiphytic and occurs in montane cloud forests. It is known from a few localities, all of them in the Cordillera Central.

References 

Flora of the Dominican Republic
Plants described in 1960
casabitoana
Flora without expected TNC conservation status